Her Wicked Ways (also known as Lethal Charm) is a 1991 American made-for-television thriller-drama film starring Barbara Eden and Heather Locklear. Directed by Richard Michaels and produced by ITC Entertainment, it originally aired on CBS on January 1, 1991.

Summary
Tess O'Brien (Barbara Eden) is a TV reporter and a White House Correspondent who lives a life of power and glamour. When Melody Shepherd (Heather Locklear) is assigned to assist her, Tess takes the younger woman under her wing. Melody idolizes Tess and is more than eager to learn to help any way she can. Soon, Melody is living in Tess' house, having an affair with her son and winning the affection of her network bosses. Tess realizes that Melody's ambitions knows no bounds and that she will use any means to reach her goals. With her job, her son and the life of a kidnapped journalist in the balance, Tess must discover the young woman's dark secrets and unravel her scheme for power.

Cast
Barbara Eden as Tess O'Brien
Heather Locklear as Melody Shepherd
Stuart Wilson as Peter Chambers
Julie Fulton as Christine
David James Elliott as Andrew
Jed Allan as Brad Duggan
Maurice Benard as Steve

Production
The film was shot on location in Washington, D.C. in March 1990.

Home media
The film was released on videocassette under the title Lethal Charm by LIVE Home Video on August 18, 1993.

Ratings
The film was watched by 24.5 million US viewers.

References

External links

1991 television films
1991 films
1990s thriller drama films
American thriller drama films
CBS network films
Films about journalism
Films scored by Fred Karlin
Films set in Washington, D.C.
Films shot in Washington, D.C.
ITC Entertainment films
American drama television films
1990s English-language films
Films directed by Richard Michaels
1990s American films